Regina Nissen (born 24 January 1961) is a German former swimmer. She competed in three events at the 1976 Summer Olympics. The FRG team for the 200m freestyle included Marion Platten, Jutta Weber and Nissen.

References

External links
 

1961 births
Living people
German female swimmers
Olympic swimmers of West Germany
Swimmers at the 1976 Summer Olympics
People from Flensburg
German female freestyle swimmers
Sportspeople from Schleswig-Holstein
20th-century German women
21st-century German women